Easy to Get is a lost 1920 American silent comedy film starring Marguerite Clark and Harrison Ford. It was produced by Famous Players-Lasky and released through Paramount Pictures.

Easy to Get was filmed at Loon Lake, Adirondack Mountains.

Plot
As described in a film magazine, Milly (Clark) and Bob Morehouse (Ford) board the train for their honeymoon immediately after the wedding ceremony. Bob meets an old friend in the smoking car. The old friend makes several well meant but poorly timed remarks concerning Bob's early successes with the fair sex which are overheard by the bride. Milly promptly drops off the train at a country crossroad and makes her way with difficulty and divers adventures to a nearby summer resort. Bob follows frantically, having numerous adventures of his own, until they reconcile and a happy ending results.

Cast
Marguerite Clark as Milly Morehouse
Harrison Ford as Bob Morehouse
Rod La Rocque as Dick Elliott (credited as Rodney LaRocque)
Helen Greene as Pauline Reid
Herbert Barrington as Talbot Chase
Kid Broad as Thaddeus Burr
H. Van Beusen as Jim Tucker
Julia Hurley as Marm Tucker
Walter Jones as Sheriff Len Philips

References

External links

Stills at the silentfilmstillarchive.com
lantern slide(archived)

1920 films
American silent feature films
Paramount Pictures films
Lost American films
1920 comedy films
Silent American comedy films
Films directed by Walter Edwards
American black-and-white films
1920 lost films
Lost comedy films
1920s American films